Decocidio (stylized as decocidio) is an anonymous, autonomous collective of hacktivists founded by lea, a Belgian-Brazilian hacker. Decocidio is part of Earth First!, a radical environmental protest organisation, and adheres to Climate Justice Action. In their hacks the group shows affiliation with the autonomous Hackbloc collective.

The logo of the collective is an upper case theta preceded by a hash symbol or number sign (#Θ). In many scripting languages the "#" introduces a comment that goes to the end of the line. The upper case theta was in 1969 made into an Ecology Symbol by cartoonist Ron Cobb, that later became associated with Earth Day. This letter of the Greek alphabet also pictured on the Ecology Flag used by American environmentalists in the 1970s.

The name decocidio is a type of word play which refers to the act of killing code. The noun consists of the stem deco- and the suffix -cidio:
 deco- is an anagram for the word code;
 -cidio originates from the Latin caedere, which means to kill. It's the Portuguese variant of the suffix -cide, as in homicide (pt: homicídio).

Actions

European Climate Exchange 
On 23 July 2010, at 23:23 UTC, Decocidio targeted the public website of the European Climate Exchange, a leading marketplace for trading  emissions in Europe. The website showed a spoof homepage for around 22 hours in an effort to promote the contention that carbon trading is a false solution to the climate crisis.

See also 
 Autonomism
 Climate Justice Action
 Earth First!
 Green anarchism
 Hacktivism
 Radical environmentalism

Notes

References

External links 
 Hackbloc
 Earth First!
 Climate Justice Action
 Mirror of the spoof homepage on the European Climate Exchange website

Hacking (computer security)
Hacker groups
Radical environmentalism
Autonomism
Green anarchism